The Boustead Cup is an annual challenge of the Men's Eight of London Rowing Club and Thames Rowing Club.
 

Taking place between February and March, upon a formal challenge from the previous years loser. The race is held over the Championship Course in London, England.

History 

The Boustead Cup was founded in 1947 by Guy Boustead as an Annual Race between London Rowing Club and Thames Rowing Club.  Guy Boustead was the son of J M Boustead, who rowed for Oxford in the University Boat Races of 1875, 1876 and 1877 (the year of the famous “dead heat”).

Course
Nearly all the 50 plus races to date have been raced on the ebb tide between Mortlake and Putney (the reverse of the University Boat Race course).  The exceptions were in 2000, 2004 and 2005 when the race was rowed between Putney and Mortlake.

Results
63 Races Rowed 

London - 32  Thames - 31 

Results 1947 to 2022 Inclusive

Women's Cup

The Boustead Cup is also supplemented by The Rayner Cup, which was introduced in 2019 a challenge between the women's crews.

External links
 Past results 

Rowing in the United Kingdom